Harmony Township is an inactive township in Washington County, in the U.S. state of Missouri.

Harmony Township was erected in 1852.

References

Townships in Missouri
Townships in Washington County, Missouri
1852 establishments in Missouri
Populated places established in 1852